Taiwanoparasitus is a genus of mites in the family Parasitidae.

Species
 Taiwanoparasitus pentasetosus Tseng, 1995

References

Parasitidae